Old Lady 31 is a 1920 American silent comedy-drama film produced and distributed by Metro Pictures and directed by John Ince. It is based on a novel by Louise Forsslund that was turned into a play by Rachel Crothers. The film starred actress Emma Dunn reprising her 1916 stage success for the screen. The film was remade in 1940 as The Captain Is a Lady.

Plot
Based upon a summary of the plot in a review in a film publication, Angie (Dunn) and Abe (Harmon) have been married for many years when bad investments force them to sell their homestead. Angie is to go to the old ladies' home while Abe is to go to live on the poor farm. When the twenty-nine inmates of the old ladies' home see how hard it is for the couple to part, they agree to take Abe in, and he is listed on their roster as "Old Lady 31." There are several comic situations as Abe wins his way into the hearts of his female companions. When some apparently worthless mining stock is found to have some value, the couple are able to return to their home.

Cast
Emma Dunn as Angie
Henry Harmon as Captain Abe Rose
Clara Knott as Blossy
Carrie Clark Ward as Abigail
Sadie Gordon as Nancy
Winifred Westover as Mary
Antrim Short as John
Lawrence Underwood as Captain Samuel Darby
Graham Pettie as Mke
Martha Mattox as Sarah Jane
Mai Wells as Mrs. Homans
Ruby Lafayette as Granny

References

External links

Internet Movie Database

Period film poster

1920 films
American silent feature films
American films based on plays
Films directed by John Ince
Lost American films
1920 comedy-drama films
1920s English-language films
American black-and-white films
Metro Pictures films
1920s American films
Silent American comedy-drama films